Late Island is an uninhabited volcanic island southwest of Vavaʻu  in the kingdom of Tonga.

Geography
The small, 6-km-wide circular island of Late, lying along the Tofua volcanic arc about 55 km WSW of the island of Vavau, contains a 400-m-wide, 150-m-deep summit crater with an ephemeral lake. The largely submerged basaltic andesite to andesitic volcano rises 1500 m from the sea floor, with its conical summit reaching 540 m above sea level. Cinder cones are found north of the summit crater, west and north of a semicircular plateau 100–150 m below the summit, and on the NW coast. A graben-like structure on the NE flank contains two large pit craters, the lower of which is partially filled by a saltwater lake. Only two eruptions have occurred in historical time, both from NE-flank craters, which produced explosive activity and possible lava flows in 1790 and 1854.

History
It was discovered by Spanish naval officer Francisco Mourelle de la Rúa on 27 February 1781, on board of the frigate Princesa. Six years later it was explored by French explorer Jean-François de La Pérouse. It was again visited by British naval officer Edward Edwards in 1791 that named it Bickerston.

In August 2019, a large raft of pumice was discovered just northeast of Late Island.

See also

 List of volcanoes in Tonga
 List of islands
 Desert island

References

External links
Virtual Globetrotting: Late Island

Uninhabited islands of Tonga
Volcanoes of Tonga
Volcanic crater lakes
Vavaʻu
Island restoration